Colin Smith (15 September 1928 – September 2018) was a Hong Kong sailor. He competed in the Flying Dutchman event at the 1972 Summer Olympics.

References

External links
 

1928 births
2018 deaths
Hong Kong male sailors (sport)
Olympic sailors of Hong Kong
Sailors at the 1972 Summer Olympics – Flying Dutchman
Sportspeople from Adelaide
Australian emigrants to Hong Kong